The Huron-Perth Catholic District School Board (known as English-language Separate District School Board No. 36 prior to 1999) is a Catholic school board operating Catholic schools in the Huron and Perth area in Southern Ontario, Canada.

The board is currently current chaired by Mary Helen Van Loon while Tina Doherty serves as the vice-chair of the board.

List of schools

Secondary schools 
 St. Anne's Catholic Secondary School
 St. Michael Catholic Secondary School

Elementary schools 
Jeanne Sauvé, Stratford
Our Lady of Mt. Carmel, Dashwood
Precious Blood, Exeter 
Sacred Heart, Wingham 
St. Aloysius, Stratford 
St. Ambrose, Stratford 
St. Boniface, Zurich 
St. Columban, Dublin
St. James, Seaforth
St. Joseph's, Clinton
St. Joseph's, Stratford
St. Mary's, Goderich 
St. Patrick's, Dublin 
St. Patrick's, Kinkora
Holy Name of Mary, St. Marys

See also 

 List of school districts in Ontario
 List of high schools in Ontario

References 

Roman Catholic school districts in Ontario